The El-Hazard Role-Playing Game is a role-playing game published by Guardians of Order in 2001.

Description
The El-Hazard Role-Playing Game is based on the first El-Hazard anime OVA series and with rules based on the company's Tri-Stat system. The gameplay is reminiscent of the company's more generalized anime-inspired game Big Eyes Small Mouth, but  features some modified mechanics and additional skills to better fit the El-Hazard universe. For example, it is possible to create "Relic characters" that are similar in nature to Ifurita, and earthling characters have access to the attribute "Unknown Superhuman Power" which allows the Game Master to pick special attributes or powers that the player must discern over the course of gameplay.

A note contained in the book suggested that the game would receive a supplement in 2002 based on characters and events from El-Hazard: The Magnificent World 2, but no such supplement was released.

Publication history
The El-Hazard Role-Playing Game was published by Guardians of Order in 2001.

El-Hazard was the last RPG produced by Guardians of Order based on an anime license.

Reception

References

BESM/dX
Canadian role-playing games
Fantasy role-playing games
Fantasy role-playing games based on anime and manga
Guardians of Order games
Role-playing games introduced in 2001